SSTC may refer to:

 Security Services Technical Committee; see 
 Shri Shankaracharya Technical Campus, Bhilai, Chhattisgarh, India
 Solid state Tesla coil, a Tesla coil that uses semiconductors in place of the traditional spark gap
 Silver Strand Training Complex, near San Diego, California, U.S.
 Starship Troopers Chronicles, a CGI animated television series 
 State Science and Technology Commission, a ministry of the People's Republic of China
 Sylhet Science And Technology College, Sylhet, Bangladesh